Everything and More: A Compact History of Infinity is a book by American novelist and essayist David Foster Wallace that examines the history of infinity, focusing primarily on the work of Georg Cantor, the 19th-century German mathematician who created set theory. The book is part of the W. W. Norton "Great Discoveries" series.

Neal Stephenson provided an "Introduction" to a reissued paperback edition (2010), which Stephenson reprinted in his collection Some Remarks : Essays and Other Writing.

Reviewers, including Rudy Rucker, A.W. Moore  and Michael Harris, have criticized its style and mathematical content.

References

 Iannis Goerlandt and Luc Herman, "David Foster Wallace." Post-war Literatures in English: A Lexicon of Contemporary Authors 56 (2004), esp. 12–14.

2003 non-fiction books
Books by David Foster Wallace
W. W. Norton & Company books